The 2012–13 New Mexico Lobos men's basketball team represented the University of New Mexico as a member of the Mountain West Conference during the 2012–13 NCAA Division I men's basketball season. The Lobos were coached by sixth-year head coach Steve Alford and played their home games at The Pit in Albuquerque, New Mexico. They finish with a record of 29–6 overall and 13–3 in Mountain West play to win the Mountain West regular season championship. They were also champions of the Mountain West tournament, defeating UNLV in the championship game, to earn an automatic bid to the 2013 NCAA tournament. In the tournament, they were upset by Harvard in the first round.

On March 20, head coach Steve Alford signed a 10-year contract extension. However, on April 2 Alford resigned to take the head coaching job at UCLA.

Departures

Recruiting

Roster

2012–13 Schedule
All times are Mountain

|-
!colspan=12 style="background:#D3003F; color:#FFFFFF;"| Exhibition

|-
!colspan=9 style="background:#D3003F; color:#FFFFFF;"| Non-conference regular season

|-
!colspan=9 style="background:#D3003F; color:#FFFFFF;"| Mountain West regular season

|-
!colspan=9 style="background:#D3003F; color:#FFFFFF;"| 2013 Mountain West Conference tournament

|-
!colspan=9 style="background:#D3003F; color:#FFFFFF;"| 2013 NCAA tournament

Rankings

References 

New Mexico Lobos men's basketball seasons
New Mexico
New Mexico
2012 in sports in New Mexico
2013 in sports in New Mexico